The Terrorist Next Door is a mystery novel and thriller by Sheldon Siegel featuring Detective David Gold, published in 2012.

Reception 
The book has received reviews from publications including Publishers Weekly, HuffPost, Booklist, and Library Journal.

References 

2012 American novels
American mystery novels
Poisoned Pen Press books